Anthony Michael Forde (born 16 November 1993) is an Irish professional footballer who currently plays for Wrexham. He has represented the Republic of Ireland at numerous youth levels.

Career

Wolves
Forde moved to Wolves in summer 2009 to become part of their academy group. He made his senior debut on 23 August 2011 as a substitute in a League Cup tie against Northampton Town, and his Premier League debut on 26 November 2011 at Chelsea. He made six appearances in the top flight as the club suffered relegation.

Having signed a contract to last until summer 2015, the winger started the first two games of new Wolves' manager Ståle Solbakken but gradually faded from the first team as the season progressed. In March 2013 he moved on loan to League One side Scunthorpe United for the remainder of the 2012–13 season.

During the 2013–14 season, Forde made only five appearances (four as substitute) as Wolves won promotion back to the Championship at the first attempt.

Walsall
On 12 August 2014, Forde joined Wolves' Midlands neighbours Walsall of League One, signing a two-year deal for an undisclosed fee. He scored his first goal for the club in a 3–0 victory over Doncaster Rovers on 27 September 2014. Forde scored a free kick in the Saddlers' 2–0 victory over Preston North End in the first leg of the Football League Trophy Northern area final on 7 January 2015. He scored his second league goal of the season on 17 January 2015 in a 2–0 win over Colchester.

Rotherham United
On 30 June 2016, it was announced that Forde had opted to join Rotherham United on a three-year-deal for an undisclosed fee. He scored his first goal for Rotherham in a 5–4 EFL Cup loss against Morecambe on 9 August 2016. He left the club at the end of his contract in June 2019.

Oxford United
On 31 July 2019, Forde signed a two-year deal with Oxford United. He made his debut in a League One victory over Peterborough United on 10 August 2019 and scored his first goal in a 4–2 defeat to Burton Albion ten days later.

Wrexham
On 28 July 2022, Forde signed a two-year deal with Wrexham.

Career statistics

Honours
Rotherham United
EFL League One play-offs: 2018

References

External links

1993 births
Living people
Association footballers from County Limerick
Republic of Ireland association footballers
Republic of Ireland youth international footballers
Republic of Ireland under-21 international footballers
Association football wingers
Wolverhampton Wanderers F.C. players
Walsall F.C. players
Scunthorpe United F.C. players
Rotherham United F.C. players
Oxford United F.C. players
Wrexham A.F.C. players
Premier League players
English Football League players
Republic of Ireland expatriate association footballers